Caelopygus is a genus of harvestmen found solely in Brazil. It is placed in the sub-family Caelopyginae, and includes two species formerly placed in the genera Liarthrodes Mello-Leitão, 1922 and Heterarthrodes Mello-Leitão, 1935:
Caelopygus elegans (Perty, 1833)
Caelopygus melanocephalus C. L. Koch in Hahn & C. L. Koch, 1839

References 

Harvestman genera
Invertebrates of Brazil